Morus, a genus of flowering plants in the family Moraceae, consists of diverse species of deciduous trees commonly known as mulberries, growing wild and under cultivation in many temperate world regions. Generally, the genus has 64 identified species, three of which are well-known and are ostensibly named for the fruit color of the best-known cultivar: white, red, and black mulberry (Morus alba, M. rubra, and M. nigra, respectively), with numerous cultivars. M. alba is native to South Asia, but is widely distributed across Europe, Southern Africa, South America, and North America. M. alba is also the species most preferred by the silkworm, and is regarded as an invasive species in Brazil and the United States.

The closely related genus Broussonetia is also commonly known as mulberry, notably the paper mulberry (Broussonetia papyrifera).

Description
The leaves are alternately arranged, simple, and often lobed and serrated on the margin. Lobes are more common on juvenile shoots than on mature trees. The trees can be monoecious or dioecious.

Immature fruits are white, green, or pale yellow. The fruit turns from pink to red while ripening, then dark purple or black, and has a sweet flavor when fully ripe.

Taxonomy

The taxonomy of Morus is complex and disputed. Fossils of Morus appear in the Pliocene record of the Netherlands. Over 150 species names have been published, and although differing sources may cite different selections of accepted names, less than 20 are accepted by the vast majority of botanical authorities. Morus classification is even further complicated by widespread hybridisation, wherein the hybrids are fertile.

The following species are accepted:

Morus alba L. – white mulberry (China, Korea, Japan)
Morus australis Poir. – East and South-East Asia
Morus boninensis Koidz.
Morus cathayana Hemsl. – China, Japan, Korea
Morus celtidifolia Kunth – Texas mulberry (southwestern United States, Mexico, Central America, South America) 
Morus indica L. – India, Southeast Asia
Morus insignis Bureau – Central and South America
Morus koordersiana J.-F.Leroy
Morus liboensis S.S.Chang – Guizhou Province in China
Morus macroura Miq. – long mulberry (Tibet, Himalayas, Indochina)
Morus mesozygia Stapf – African mulberry (south and central Africa)
Morus microphylla Buckley
Morus miyabeana Hotta
Morus mongolica (Bureau) C.K.Schneid.
Morus nigra L. - black mulberry (Iran, Caucasus, Levant)
Morus notabilis C.K.Schneid. – Yunnan and Sichuan Provinces in China
Morus rubra L. – red mulberry (eastern North America)
Morus serrata Roxb. – Tibet, Nepal, northwestern India
Morus trilobata (S.S.Chang) Z.Y.Cao – Guizhou Province in China
Morus wittiorum Hand.-Mazz. – southern China

In southern Brazil, the mulberry is known as amorinha.

Distribution

Black, red, and white mulberries are widespread in Southern Europe, the Middle East, northern Africa, and the Indian subcontinent, where the tree and the fruit have names under regional dialects. Black mulberry was imported to Britain in the 17th century in the hope that it would be useful in the cultivation of silkworms. It was much used in folk medicine, especially in the treatment of ringworm.  Mulberries are also widespread in Greece, particularly in the Peloponnese, which in the Middle Ages was known as Morea, deriving from the Greek word for the tree.

Cultivation 

Mulberries can be grown from seed, and this is often advised, as seedling-grown trees are generally of better shape and health. Mulberry trees grown from seed can take up to ten years to bear fruit. Mulberries are most often planted from large cuttings, which root readily. They are specially raised with the help of well-grown saplings 8–10 months old of any of the varieties recommended for rainfed areas like S-13 (for red loamy soil) or S-34 (black cotton soil), which are tolerant to drought or soil-moisture stress conditions. The leaves are harvested three or four times a year by a leaf-picking method under rain-fed or semiarid conditions, depending on the monsoon. The tree branches pruned during the fall season (after the leaves have fallen) are cut and used to make durable baskets supporting agriculture and animal husbandry.

Some North American cities have banned the planting of mulberries because of the large amounts of pollen they produce, posing a potential health hazard for some pollen allergy sufferers. Actually, only the male mulberry trees produce pollen; this lightweight pollen can be inhaled deeply into the lungs, sometimes triggering asthma. Conversely, female mulberry trees produce all-female flowers, which draw pollen and dust from the air. Because of this pollen-absorbing feature, all-female mulberry trees have an OPALS allergy scale rating of just 1 (lowest level of allergy potential), and some consider it "allergy-free".

Mulberry tree scion wood can easily be grafted onto other mulberry trees during the winter, when the tree is dormant. One common scenario is converting a problematic male mulberry tree to an allergy-free female tree, by grafting all-female mulberry tree scions to a male mulberry that has been pruned back to the trunk. However, any new growth from below the graft(s) must be removed, as they would be from the original male mulberry tree.

Toxicity
All parts of the plant besides the ripe fruit contain a toxic milky sap. Eating too many berries may have a laxative effect. Additionally, unripe green fruit may cause nausea, cramps, and a hallucinogenic effect.

Uses

Nutrition 

Raw mulberries are 88% water, 10% carbohydrates, 1% protein, and less than 1% fat. In a  reference amount, raw mulberries provide 43 calories, 44% of the Daily Value (DV) for vitamin C, and 14% of the DV for iron; other micronutrients are insignificant in quantity.

Consumption
As the fruit matures, mulberries change in texture and color, becoming succulent, plump, and juicy, resembling a blackberry. The color of the fruit does not distinguish the mulberry species, as mulberries may be white, lavender or black in color. White mulberry fruits are typically sweet, but not tart, while red mulberries are usually deep red, sweet, and juicy. Black mulberries are large and juicy, with balanced sweetness and tartness.

The fruit of the East Asian white mulberry – a species extensively naturalized in urban regions of eastern North America – has a different flavor, sometimes characterized as refreshing and a little tart, with a bit of gumminess to it and a hint of vanilla. In North America, the white mulberry is considered an invasive exotic and has taken over extensive tracts from native plant species, including the red mulberry.

Mulberries are used in pies, tarts, wines, cordials, and herbal teas. The fruit of the black mulberry (native to southwest Asia) and the red mulberry (native to eastern North America) have distinct flavors likened to 'fireworks in the mouth'. Jams and sherbets are often made from the fruit in the Old World.

The tender twigs are semisweet and can be eaten raw or cooked.

As a supplement
The fruit and leaves are sold in various forms as dietary supplements.

Silk industry

Mulberry leaves, particularly those of the white mulberry, are ecologically important as the sole food source of the silkworm (Bombyx mori, named after the mulberry genus Morus), the cocoon of which is used to make silk. The wild silk moth also eats mulberry. Other Lepidoptera larvae—which include the common emerald, lime hawk-moth, sycamore moth, and fall webworm—also eat the plant.

The Ancient Greeks and Romans cultivated the mulberry for silkworms; at least as early as 220 AD, Emperor Elagabalus wore a silk robe. English clergy wore silk vestments from about 1500 onwards. Mulberry and the silk industry played a role in colonial Virginia.

Pigments
Mulberry fruit color derives from anthocyanins, which have unknown effects in humans. Anthocyanins are responsible for the attractive colors of fresh plant foods, including orange, red, purple, black, and blue. These colors are water-soluble and easily extractable, yielding natural food colorants. Due to a growing demand for natural food colorants, they have numerous applications in the food industry.

A cheap and industrially feasible method has been developed to extract anthocyanins from mulberry fruit that could be used as a fabric dye or food colorant of high color value (above 100). Scientists found that, of 31 Chinese mulberry cultivars tested, the total anthocyanin yield varied from 148 to 2725 mg/L of fruit juice. Sugars, acids, and vitamins of the fruit remained intact in the residual juice after removal of the anthocyanins, indicating that the juice may be used to other food products.

Mulberry germplasm resources may be used for:
 exploration and collection of fruit yielding mulberry species
 their characterization, cataloging, and evaluation for anthocyanin content by using traditional, as well as modern, means and biotechnology tools
 developing an information system about these cultivars and varieties
 training and global coordination of genetic stocks
 evolving suitable breeding strategies to improve the anthocyanin content in potential breeds by collaboration with various research stations in the field of sericulture, plant genetics, and breeding, biotechnology and pharmacology

Paper 
During the Angkorian age of the Khmer Empire of Southeast Asia, monks at Buddhist temples made paper from the bark of mulberry trees. The paper was used to make books, known as kraing.

Tengujo is the thinnest paper in the world. It is produced in Japan and made with kozo (stems of mulberry trees).

Wood 
The wood of mulberry trees is used for barrel aging of Țuică, a traditional Romanian plum brandy.

Culture

A Babylonian etiological myth, which Ovid incorporated in his Metamorphoses, attributes the reddish-purple color of the mulberry fruits to the tragic deaths of the lovers Pyramus and Thisbe. Meeting under a mulberry tree (probably the native Morus nigra), Thisbe commits suicide by sword after Pyramus does the same, he having believed, on finding her bloodstained cloak, that she was killed by a lion. Their splashed blood stained the previously white fruit, and the gods forever changed the mulberry's colour to honour their forbidden love.

The nursery rhyme "Here We Go Round the Mulberry Bush" uses the tree in the refrain, as do some contemporary American versions of the nursery rhyme "Pop Goes the Weasel".

Vincent van Gogh featured the mulberry tree in some of his paintings, notably Mulberry Tree (1889, now in Pasadena's Norton Simon Museum). He painted it after a stay at an asylum, and he considered it a technical success.

References

External links

 Flora of China: Morus
 Flora of North America: Morus
 Sorting Morus names (University of Melbourne)
 Propagation (growing) by vegetative method
 Propagation (growing) by seed method
 photo of 300-year-old Japanese mulberry 
 Central Sericultural Germplasm Resources Centre, Ministry of Textiles, Government of India
 Replant a mulberry tree: article from The Times of India
 The Morus Londinium project - Mulberry tree heritage in London, UK

 
Berries
Fruit trees
Medicinal plants
Moraceae genera
Taxa named by Carl Linnaeus